Louis-Jacques Boucot also known under the pseudonyms Louis Boucaud or Louis Boucot, (3 November 1882 in Paris – 28 March 1949 in Paris) was a 20th-century French actor and film director. He appeared in films between 1910 (Une gentille petite femme by Georges Denola) and 1938 in La Pésidente by Fernand Rivers.

He also played in the series Babylas by Alfred Machin (Babylas vient d'hériter d'une panthère, Babylas explorateur, Babylas habite une maison bien tranquille and Madame Babylas aime les animaux in 1911 ; Babylas va se marier in 1912.)

Filmography 

1910: Une gentille petite femme by Georges Denola 
1911: L'art de se faire aimer (anonymous)
1911: Babylas a hérité d'une panthère by Alfred Machin 
1911: Babylas explorateur by Alfred Machin 
1911: Babylas habite une maison tranquille by Alfred Machin 
1911: Le chef de Saint-Martin (anonymous)
1911: La dame de compagnie by Louis Feuillade
1911: L'engin suspect (anonymous)
1911: Madame Babylas aime les animaux by Alfred Machin 
1911: Soir de première (anonymous)
1911: Un ami trop entreprenant (anonymous)
1912: J'attend ma mère (anonymous)
1912: Suicide par amour (anonymous)
1912: Théodore n'est pas sérieux (anonymous)
1912: Babylas va se marier by Alfred Machin 
1912: Les bienfaits de la culture physique (anonymous)
1912: Le cauchemar d'un gendre (anonymous)
1912: Le corsage de madame Penard (anonymous)
1912: La garçonnière de Monsieur Flock (anonymous)
1912: Madame se venge (anonymous)
1912: Œil pour œil (anonymous)
1912: Penard a trop d'enfants (anonymous)
1912: Penard dentiste (anonymous)
1912: Penard est fiancé (anonymous)
1912: Penard est superstitieux (anonymous)
1912: Penard et la femme idéale (anonymous) 
1912: Penard et le faux Rigadin by Georges Monca 
1912: Penard n'aime pas la poussière (anonymous)
1912: Penard paie son terme (anonymous)
1912: Penard prend un bain de pied froid (anonymous)
1912: Penard protège les animaux (anonymous)
1912: Pour sauver Madame (anonymous)
1913: Penard chasseur (anonymous)
1913: Penard escamoteur (anonymous)
1913: Penard et Latringle agents de police (anonymous)
1913: Penard et les menottes (anonymous)
1913: Penard veut se faire aimer (anonymous)
1913: Pour avoir une fille (anonymous)
1916: L'Hôtel du libre échange by Marcel Simon 
1916: Paris pendant la guerre by Henri Diamant-Berger  - Film in 4 tableaux -
1916: Vous n'avez rien à déclarer ? (anonymous)
1916: Dormez je le veux by Marcel Simon  
1920: La Première Idylle de Boucot by Robert Saidreau 
1929: Ta bouche (anonymous) - filmed song
1930: Chanson Bretonne (anonymous) - filmed song
1930: Une femme a menti by Charles de Rochefort
1930: Paramount on Parade by Charles de Rochefort
1930: Arthur or Le Culte de la beauté by Léonce Perret
1930: Clinique musicale (anonymous) - short film -
1930: Un débrouillard (anonymous) - short film -
1931: Le Costaud des P.T.T by Jean Bertin and Rudolph Maté
1931: La Terreur des Batignolles by Henri-Georges Clouzot - short film -
1932: La Bonne Aventure by Henri Diamant-Berger
1933: La Bosse des affaires by Arnaudy + Lyrics
1933: Incogniot / Son altesse voyage by Kurt Gerron
1934: Brevet 95-75 by Pierre Miquel
1935: La Rosière des halles by Jean de Limur
1935: La Coqueluche de ces dames by Gabriel Rosca
1936: Notre-Dame d'Amour by Pierre Caron
1936: Les Demi-vierges by Pierre Caron
1937: The Puritan by Jeff Musso - as M. Kelly
1938: La Présidente by Fernand Rivers
1938: Three Waltzes by Ludwig Berger

References

External links 
 Filmographie sur DVD Toile

20th-century French male actors
French film directors
Male actors from Paris
1882 births
1949 deaths